Minolia peramabilis, common name the lovely Pacific margarite,  is a species of sea snail, a marine gastropod mollusk in the family Solariellidae.

Description
The height of the shell attains 8 mm, its diameter 8 mm.
The very thinshell is very elegantly sculptured. It is livid, spotted with pale rufous-brown. The protoconch consists of 2 whorls, very tumid and smooth. The apex is mammillated. The teleoconch consists of 4 whorls. These are tabulated, with their sutures nearly rectangular. Upon the spire there are two or three carinae, and intercalated carinulae. The entire surface is most elegantly and densely radiately costate. The costae are very acute, subgranulose upon the carinae. The interstices on the first whorl are fenestrated, posteriorly decussated. The base of the shell is deeply rounded. The shell is  sculptured with about 5 lirulae, anteriorly granulose. The umbilicus is large, closely ornamented with about 3 spiral distant lines, and radiating costulations continued from the base. The umbilicus is bounded by a granular keel, but has three other distant spiral lines crossing the lirulae. The rounded aperture is indentated by the carinae, scarcely in contact parietally, iridescent inside and nacreous. The operculum is very thin, multispiral, with about 10 elegantly rugulose whorls. The aperture is sculptured with delicate waved radiating lines.

Distribution
This marine species occurs off Alaska and western Canada

References

 Carpenter P. (1872) The Mollusks of Western North America, Smithsonian Institution, Washington

External links
 To Biodiversity Heritage Library (30 publications)
 To Encyclopedia of Life
 To USNM Invertebrate Zoology Mollusca Collection
 To ITIS
 To World Register of Marine Species
 Gastropods.com: Minolia peramabilis

peramabilis
Gastropods described in 1864